A Grey Sigh in a Flower Husk is a split LP by American heavy metal bands Baroness and Unpersons. The artwork was done by Baroness singer John Baizley.

Track listing
All Baroness songs written by Baroness, lyrics by John Baizley.

Personnel

Baroness
 John Baizley – vocals/guitar
 Allen Blickle – drums
 Tim Loose – guitar
 Summer Welch – bass

Unpersons
 Carl McGinley – drums
 Matt Maggioni – bass
 Sanders Creasy – vocals/guitars
 Judson Abbott – guitars

References

External links
Vinyl Pressing Info and Pictures

2007 albums
Split albums
Baroness (band) albums
Albums with cover art by John Dyer Baizley